A maternity colony refers to a temporary association of reproductive female bats for giving birth to, nursing, and weaning their pups. The colonies are initiated by pregnant bats. After giving birth, the colony consists of the lactating females and their offspring. After weaning, juveniles will leave the maternity colony, and the colony itself will break apart. The size of a maternity colony is highly variable by species, with some species forming colonies consisting of ten or fewer individuals, while the largest maternity colony in the world in Bracken Cave is estimated to have over 15 million bats.

Benefits of a maternity colony
Maternity colonies are especially prevalent in temperate regions due to the thermal benefits of roosting with other individuals.
Outside of the winter months, non-reproductive females and male bats enter torpor for short periods to conserve energy when temperatures are below an optimum threshold. However, torpor is detrimental to reproductive females because it delays the development of the fetus and slows milk production.
Therefore, female bats are highly incentivized to maintain a constant body temperature. 
Roosting in a large group allows females to share body heat, lowering the energetic costs for individuals.

Risks of a maternity colony
Roosting in large groups brings risks to the members of a maternity colony. Predators such as hawks and owls can learn to anticipate the emergence of bats from a specific roost at sunset.
Smaller colonies are thought to be less risky than larger colonies, because the nightly emergence of bats would attract less attention.

Species that form maternity colonies

References 

Bats